Into the Woods is a musical production written by Stephen Sondheim and James Lapine.

Into the Woods  may also refer to:

Film and television
 Into the Woods (film), a 2014 Disney film based on the Sondheim musical
 "Into the Woods" (Brooklyn Nine-Nine)
 "Into the Woods" (Buffy the Vampire Slayer)
 "Into the Woods" (Desperate Housewives)
 "Into the Woods" (Gotham)
 "Into the Woods", an episode of Criminal Minds
 "Into the Woods", a TV show on the station CRTV, hosted by Phil Robertson
 "Into the Woods", one of 7 unaired episodes of Dinosaurs
 "Into the Woods", an episode of You

Literature
 Into the Woods (novel), a children's fantasy novel by Lyn Gardner
 Into the Woods (Warriors), a manga for the Warriors series by Erin Hunter
 Into the Woods, a collection of short stories by fantasy author Kim Harrison
 Into the Woods: A Five Act Journey Into Story, how to write screen plays by John Yorke

Music
 Into the Woods (Malcolm Middleton album), 2005
 Into the Woods (Hawkwind album), 2017
 Into the Woods: The Best of Phil Woods, a 1996 compilation album by Phil Woods
 Into the Woods (EP), a 2011 EP by Of Monsters and Men
 Into the Woods (soundtrack), the soundtrack to the 2014 Disney film
 "Into the Woods", a song by My Morning Jacket from the album Z

See also
Into the Forest, a 2015   film based on an eponymous 1996 novel